Raemian (Korean: 래미안, Hanja: 來美安) is a brand of Samsung C&T Corporation for apartments. Raemian has been ranked No.1 on NCSI (National Customer Satisfaction Index) for apartment construction since 1998.

See also
 Samsung C&T Corporation

Notes and references

External links
 Official Website of Samsung C&T Corporation
 Samsung Engineering & Construction
 Official Website of Raemian 

Samsung C&T Corporation
Construction and civil engineering companies of South Korea